James Mitchell Baker (14 February 1878 – 14 December 1956) was a South African long-distance runner. He competed in the men's marathon at the 1908 Summer Olympics.

References

1878 births
1956 deaths
Athletes (track and field) at the 1908 Summer Olympics
South African male long-distance runners
South African male marathon runners
Olympic athletes of South Africa
Scottish emigrants to South Africa
Sportspeople from Glasgow